Octogomphus, the grappletail, is a genus of club-tailed dragonflies found in North America, containing the single species Octogomphus specularis.

The Grappletail, not seen in British Columbia for 40 years, was re-discovered by citizen scientists in July 2020, during a hike in Davis Lake Provincial Park, near Mission, B.C.

References

External links

Octogomphus, BugGuide

Gomphidae
Monotypic Odonata genera
Taxa named by Edmond de Sélys Longchamps